Gulshan-e-Amna is a small neighbourhood of Faisal Cantonment in Karachi, Sindh, Pakistan.

There are several ethnic groups in Gulshan-e-Amna including Muhajirs, Sindhis, Punjabis, Kashmiris, Seraikis, Pakhtuns, Balochis, Memons, Bohras,  Ismailis, etc.

References

External links 
 Official Karachi Website 

Neighbourhoods of Karachi